Highway 61 is a soundtrack album to the Canadian film Highway 61, released in 1991.

The album produced the first chart hit for Canadian alternative band Bourbon Tabernacle Choir, "Put Your Head On". It also resulted in a left-field chart success for Tom Jones, whose 1965 single "It's Not Unusual" charted on Canadian modern rock and campus radio stations as a result of its inclusion the soundtrack.

Nash the Slash also composed the film's score.

Track listing
 Nash the Slash, "Into the Land of the Fire"
 Rita Chiarelli and Colin Linden, "Highway 61 Revisited"
 Bourbon Tabernacle Choir, "Put Your Head On"
 Acid Test, "Dance"
 Jane Hawley, "Momma's Waitin'"
 Sam Larkin, "Sally On"
 The Razorbacks, "My Way or the Highway"
 Tom Jones, "It's Not Unusual"
 Tav Falco, "Torture"
 Acid Test, "Mr. Skin"
 Jellyfishbabies, "The Erlking"
 Anne Marie Stern, Carlton Rance, Vanessa Younger and Rosie Westney, "Can't Nobody Do Me Like Jesus"
 Boozoo Chavis, "Zydeco Heehaw"

1991 soundtrack albums
Soundtracks by Canadian artists